Thieriot or Thiériot is a surname. Notable people with the surname include:

Ferdinand Thieriot (1838–1919), German composer 
Jean-Louis Thiériot (born 1969), French politician
Max Thieriot (born 1988), American actor and director

See also
Theriot

Surnames
French-language surnames
Surnames of French origin
Surnames of German origin